{{Infobox journal
| title = Annual Review of Materials Research
| cover = Annual_Review_of_Materials_Research_cover.png
| editor = David R. Clarke
| discipline = Materials science
| formernames = Annual Review of Materials Science (1971–2000)'
| abbreviation = Annu. Rev. Mater. Res.
| publisher = Annual Reviews
| country = US
| frequency = Annually
| history = 1971–present,  years old
| openaccess =
| license =
| impact = 13.972
| impact-year = 2021
| website = https://www.annualreviews.org/journal/matsci
| JSTOR = 
| OCLC = 66548704
| LCCN = 75172108
| CODEN = ARMSCX
| ISSN = 0084-6600
| eISSN = 1545-4118
}}

The Annual Review of Materials Research is a peer-reviewed journal that publishes review articles about materials science. It has been published by the nonprofit Annual Reviews since 1971, when it was first released under the title the Annual Review of Materials Science. Three people have served as editors, with the current editor David R. Clarke serving in the position since 2001. It has an impact factor of 13.972 as of 2022.

History
The Annual Review of Materials Science was first published in 1971 by the nonprofit publisher Annual Reviews, making it their sixteenth journal. Its first editor was Robert Huggins. In 2001, its name was changed to the current form, the Annual Review of Materials Research. The name change was intended "to better reflect the broad appeal that materials research has for so many diverse groups of scientists and not simply those who identify themselves with the academic discipline of materials science." As of 2020, it was published both in print and electronically.

It defines its scope as covering significant developments in the field of materials science, including methodologies for studying materials and materials phenomena. As of 2022, Journal Citation Reports gives the journal a 2021 impact factor of 13.972, ranking it twenty-seventh of 345 titles in the category "Materials Science, Multidisciplinary".  It is abstracted and indexed in Scopus, Science Citation Index Expanded, Civil Engineering Abstracts, INSPEC, and Academic Search, among others.

Editorial processes
The Annual Review of Materials Research'' is helmed by the editor or the co-editors. The editor is assisted by the editorial committee, which includes associate editors, regular members, and occasionally guest editors. Guest members participate at the invitation of the editor, and serve terms of one year. All other members of the editorial committee are appointed by the Annual Reviews board of directors and serve five-year terms. The editorial committee determines which topics should be included in each volume and solicits reviews from qualified authors. Unsolicited manuscripts are not accepted. Peer review of accepted manuscripts is undertaken by the editorial committee.

Editors of volumes
Dates indicate publication years in which someone was credited as a lead editor or co-editor of a journal volume. The planning process for a volume begins well before the volume appears, so appointment to the position of lead editor generally occurred prior to the first year shown here. An editor who has retired or died may be credited as a lead editor of a volume that they helped to plan, even if it is published after their retirement or death. 

 Robert Huggins (1971–1993)
 Elton N. Kaufmann (1994–2000)
 David R. Clarke (2001–present)

Current editorial committee
As of 2022, the editorial committee consists of the editor and the following members:

 Don Lipkin
 Ram Seshadri
 Sossina M. Haile
 Vikram Jayaram
 Wayne D. Kaplan
 Bettina V. Lotsch
 Christine Luscombe
 Yang Shen

See also
 List of materials science journals

References

 

Materials Research
Publications established in 1971
Materials science journals
English-language journals
Annual journals